The Toulouse Hawks are an Australian rules football team based in Toulouse, France. As of 2018, the team primarily competes in the national competitions in France including the Championnat de France and the French Cup. The team typically wears black and white jumpers.

History 
Originally formed in 2008 as the Toulouse Crocodiles, the Toulouse Hawks first competed in the Championnat de France in the 2009/2010 season, finishing 3rd overall. The club would go on to win the league in the 2012/2013 and 2013/2014 seasons as well as the 2010 and 2015 editions of the French Cup. Following the 2015/2016 season, the Blagnac Aviators were formed in Blagnac, France, with a number of players from the Toulouse Hawks moving to play with the new team due to its proximity.

Results

References

External links 
 Site officiel du club

2008 establishments in France
Australian rules football clubs in France
Sport in Toulouse
Sport in France